Laram Pukara (Aymara larama blue, pukara fortress / mountain of protection, "blue fortress" or "blue mountain of protection", Hispanicized spelling Laram Pucara, labeled Larani Pacara in the BIGM map) is a   mountain in the Cordillera Occidental in the Andes of Bolivia. It is located in the Oruro Department, Mejillones Province, La Rivera Municipality. Laram Pukara lies south-east of the mountain Kimsa Chata and north-east of the mountain Taypi Qullu.

References 

Mountains of Oruro Department